The 1960 United States presidential election in Nebraska took place on November 8, 1960, as part of the 1960 United States presidential election. Voters chose six representatives, or electors, to the Electoral College, who voted for president and vice president.

Nebraska was won by incumbent Vice President Richard Nixon (R–California), running with United States Ambassador to the United Nations Henry Cabot Lodge, Jr., with 62.07% of the popular vote, against Senator John F. Kennedy (D–Massachusetts), running with Senator Lyndon B. Johnson, with 37.93% of the popular vote.

With 62.07% of the popular vote, Nebraska would prove to be Nixon's strongest state in the 1960 election.

Primaries

Democratic primary

Kennedy  won the state's Democratic primary.

While an effort by Stuart Symington or Hubert Humphrey could have, on paper, been successful in Nebraska's primary, Kennedy had managed to outmaneuver them, laying early groundwork which gave him a solid lead in the state.

Kennedy managed, in early 1958, to secure Bernard Boyle's support.

By the time that others such as Humphrey, Symington, and Johnson began to inquire with Boyle about their own prospective candidacies, they learned that they had a arrived a year too late.

Kennedy went in to win the primary, unchallenged. With the exception of Kennedy, all candidates were write-ins.

Republican primary

Nixon won the state's Republican primary. All candidates were write-ins.

Results

Results by county

See also
 United States presidential elections in Nebraska

References

Nebraska
1960
1960 Nebraska elections